Walter Arena (born 30 May 1964) is a male race walker from Italy.

He continues to race, winning the M45 at the 2012 European Masters Athletics Championships 5,000 metres walk.

Biography
Walter Arena won three medal (one at individual level), at the International athletics competitions. He participated at one edition of the Summer Olympics (1992), he has 28 caps in national team from 1984 to 1997.

National records
 20000 m walk: 1:19:24 ( Fana, 26 May 1990) - current holder

Achievements

See also
 Italian records in athletics
 Italian team at the running events

References

External links
 
 

1964 births
Living people
Italian male racewalkers
Italian masters athletes
Athletes (track and field) at the 1992 Summer Olympics
Athletics competitors of Fiamme Azzurre
Olympic athletes of Italy
Universiade medalists in athletics (track and field)
Sportspeople from Catania
World Athletics Championships athletes for Italy
Universiade gold medalists for Italy
Medalists at the 1989 Summer Universiade
20th-century Italian people